Paradakeoceras is a genus of early Ordovician cephalopods belonging to the nautiloid order Ellesmerocerida.

Morphology 
The shell of Paradakeoceras is an expanding endogastric cyrtocone with the siphuncle situated near the shell's concave margin. 
A raised ring exists at the base of the body chamber, which is often preserved as a mould.

Paradakeoceras was named by Flower, 1964, for species previously included in Dakeoceras in which the cross section is broadened with consequent loss of lateral lobes in the suture.

Paradakeoceras shows a flattening of the venter which distinguishes it from Quebecoceras and has a reduction in the rate of expansion similar to that of Dakeoceras.

References 

Prehistoric nautiloid genera
Ordovician cephalopods
Ordovician cephalopods of North America
Ellesmerocerida